Bishop Duppa's Almshouses, Richmond are Grade II listed almshouses in Richmond, London. They were founded by Brian Duppa, Bishop of Winchester, in 1661 (during the reign of Charles II) to house ten unmarried women aged over 50.

The almshouses were originally  built on Richmond Hill. By the 19th century they had become dilapidated. They were rebuilt in 1851 in The Vineyard, Richmond next to Queen Elizabeth's Almshouses and the front arch and gateway from the previous site are believed to have been incorporated in the rebuilding. The new site was provided by James Ewing, owner of the neighbouring Downe House, Richmond Hill. He also paid for their rebuilding, in white brick to a Jacobean design by Thomas Little, receiving the old almshouse site in exchange.

Numbers 8, 9 and 10 were rebuilt in 1949 after Second World War bomb damage.

The almshouses are now managed by The Richmond Charities. New residents are accepted from 65 years of age.

See also
List of almshouses in the United Kingdom

References

External links
The Richmond Charities

1851 establishments in England
Grade II listed almshouses
History of the London Borough of Richmond upon Thames
Residential buildings completed in 1661
Residential buildings completed in 1851
Almshouses in Richmond, London
The Vineyard, Richmond